Auxanommatidia is a genus of flies in the family Phoridae.

Species
A. abbreviata Borgmeier, 1958
A. californica Borgmeier, 1963
A. hardicki Borgmeier, 1925
A. intermedia Borgmeier & Prado, 1975
A. myrmecophila Borgmeier, 1925
A. pilifemur Borgmeier, 1925
A. simplex Borgmeier, 1958
A. variegata Borgmeier, 1924

References

Phoridae
Platypezoidea genera